The treasure guardian is a recurring motif in folklore of a being that guards a treasure. Typically, the hero must overcome the guardian in order to obtain the treasure. In some cases the treasure guardians are non-human beings, although one subtype, known as "treasure ghosts", were deceased humans who had been murdered and buried with the treasure to protect it. Animals are often shown as treasure guardians—an index of folklore chronicles stories of snakes, crows, ravens, cocks, swans, and night-birds as treasure guardians. In some stories, the treasure is guarded by "the Devil himself".

In folklore
 Jinn, an Arabian legendary creature sometimes depicted as a treasure guardian
 Gnome, a European legendary creature sometimes depicted as a treasure guardian
 Leprechaun, a treasure guardian from Irish folklore
 Dragon, a creature often portrayed as hoarding a treasure
 Salamander, a legendary creature often described as a lizard in shape (even looking like a common salamander), but usually with an affinity for fire
 Spriggan, Cornish guardian of fairy treasure, said to be the ghosts of giants that can swell to enormous sizes.

In popular culture
 Indiana Jones and the Last Crusade features a crusader knight who guards the Holy Grail.
 Works by Tolkien feature Smaug, a treasure-guarding dragon.

See also
 Salamander letter

Notes

Recurring elements in folklore